The Jungster II is a parasol wing homebuilt aircraft. Designed by Rim Kaminskas, it first flew in March 1966.

Design and development
The Jungster II is a parasol version based on the previous Jungster I biplane design, which itself was a scaled down version of the Bücker Bü 133 biplane. Plans are distributed by Howard Allmon.

The aircraft is a single-seat, open cockpit, strut-braced, parasol wing design with conventional landing gear. The fuselage is constructed of 7/8 x 7/8 wood truss with aircraft fabric covering. The wing has a slight rearward sweep.

Specifications (Jungster II)

See also
Kaminskas Jungster I
Ace Baby Ace

References

External links
Image of a Jungster II

Homebuilt aircraft